Colonel Saïd Mohammedi (27 December 1912 – 6 December 1994), or Si Nacer, was an Algerian nationalist and politician.

Early life and collaborationism
Born in the Berber Kabyle region of Tizi Ouzou, Saïd Mohammadi served in the French army. Attracted to Algerian nationalism, and intensely religious, he became involved with the Mufti of Jerusalem, Hajj Amin al-Husseini. During World War II, he joined the al-Husseini to work with Nazi Germany, hoping that Hitler's defeat of France would lead to the liberation of Algeria and other French colonies. He enlisted in the Wehrmacht and fought in the Balkans (Yugoslavia and Greece) as well as on the Russian front during Operation Barbarossa. After a stay in Berlin, he received the Iron Cross First Class, for exemplary soldiers.

In the summer of 1944, along with five others (Algerians and Germans), he was sent by the Abwehr on intelligence and sabotage missions to Algeria, but was arrested in the region of Tebessa and sentenced to life in prison but paroled after a few years.  He was known for always wearing his Wehrmacht steel helmet during Algerian War.

FLN career 

Saïd Mohammedi was an activist for the North African Star, the PPA and the MTLD. He made contact with the resistance as soon as he was released from prison in 1952.

In 1956, he participated in the Soummam congress with Krim Belkacem, of whom he was the first Deputy, to dissipate he became First Colonel of Wilaya III, with the commanders Amirouche Aït Hamouda, Abderrahmane Mira and Hamai Mohand Oukaci as deputy. He also became a member of the CNRA.

During the years 1957, elements of the MNA, supported by the French army, organized military actions against the ALN, eliminating soldiers and officers. In retaliation for these actions, Lieutenant Bariki organized an attack against the messalist centers considered to be counter revolutionary.

As Head of Wilaya III, he sends captain Mohand Arav Bessaoud to investigate first, then Commander Amirouche secondly, which again confirms Captain Mohand's report. Saïd said to assume the events of Melouza although he was not directly given the order.

Known for his mobilizing speeches, he successfully organized the troops and instilled in them rigor and the military spirit, thereby making Wilaya III the most powerful and best organized of the Wilayas. Fact which earned him to be chosen by his peers to create the Academy of senior officers in Cairo with a view to being appointed as the first general officer of the National Liberation Army (ALN); as a result, he was appointed by the Chief of Staff of the Provisional Government of the Algerian Republic. He thus took command of the ALN.

In 1957, he was appointed First Chief of the Military Organization Committee (COM) by the CCE. After a first reorganization, he was in charge of the COM Est, which brought together representatives of Wilaya I, II and III. During a second reorganization of the COM, he was appointed Minister of State of the GPRA, until the independence of Algeria.

Post-independence career 

Mohammedi was elected at the Congress of Tripoli to be a member of the Political Bureau, responsible for the Education and Public Health sector. Deputy of Tizi Ouzou on 20 September 1962, and he was appointed Minister of Former Mujahedin and War Victims in the first government of Ahmed Ben Bella. On 16 May 1963, he became 2nd vice-president of the Council, and member of the Central Committee and the Political Bureau of the FLN on 24 April 1964.  He was dismissed by Ben Bella and lost his ministerial post during the reshuffle of 2 December 1964.

In 1965, he became a member of the Revolutionary Council, after Houari Boumédiène took power. In 1967, during the commemoration of the death of Amirouche Aït Hamouda in the village of Tassaft Ouguemoun, he gave a last meeting in which he denounced the autocratic policy of Boumédiène. He designated him by name as a despot and a dictator. The latter assigned him under house arrest for three years.

In the 1991 documentary The Algerian Years, Mohammedi detailed the activities of his soldiers who took part in the massacre of Melouza, against the messalists. At the end of his life, he was a supporter of the Islamic Salvation Front, which he saw as a popular movement capable of changing the regime in place.

He died on 5 December 1994 in Paris.

References

Achour Cheurfi, La classe politique algérienne, de 1900 à nos jours. Dictionnaire biographique (Casbah Editions, 2nd edition, Algiers 2006)
Jacques Duchemin, Histoire du F. L. N. (Editions Mimouni, Algiers 2006)

1912 births
1994 deaths
Algerian nationalists
Algerian Sunni Muslims
Kabyle people
Vice presidents of Algeria
Islamic Salvation Front politicians
Algerian collaborators with Nazi Germany
National Liberation Front (Algeria) politicians
People from Larbaâ Nath Irathen
Waffen-SS foreign volunteers and conscripts
Legion of French Volunteers Against Bolshevism personnel